Georg Warsow (born 22 September 1877, date of death unknown) was a German road racing cyclist who competed in the 1912 Summer Olympics. He was born in Bütow.

In 1912 he was a member of the German cycling team which finished sixth in the team time trial event. In the individual time trial competition he finished 36th.

References

1877 births
Year of death missing
German male cyclists
Olympic cyclists of Germany
Cyclists at the 1912 Summer Olympics
People from Bytów County
People from the Province of Pomerania
20th-century German people